Belle Rive may refer to:

 Belle Rive, Illinois, United States
 Belle Rive, Edmonton, a neighborhood in Edmonton, Alberta, Canada

See also
 Bellerive (disambiguation)
 Rive (disambiguation)